Jason Rathbun is a baseball coach and former pitcher, who is the current head baseball coach of the St. Bonaventure Bonnies. He played college baseball at Herkimer in 2000 and 2001 before transferring to Erskine from 2002 to 2003. He served as the head coach of the Herkimer Generals (2005–2022).

Playing career
Rathbun grew up in Little Falls, New York, where he attended Little Falls High School, where he was a letterwinner for the Mounties in baseball, basketball and football. He would go on the play college baseball for Herkimer College, where after two years, he earned an opportunity to play at Erskine College. Rathbun was used as a swingman as a junior, starting 7 games and appearing in 7 more as a reliever. He had a 3–2 record and a 5.52 ERA. As a senior, he posted a 4–2 record with a 3.69 ERA in 31 innings.

Coaching career
In April, 2021, Rathbun won his 500th career game for Herkimer. During the 2022 season, he led the Generals to the first ever JUCO World Series championship.

On August 2, 2022, Rathbun was named the head baseball coach of the St. Bonaventure Bonnies.

Head coaching record

References

External links
St. Bonaventure Bonnies bio

Living people
Herkimer Generals baseball coaches
Herkimer Generals baseball players
St. Bonaventure Bonnies baseball coaches
Erskine Flying Fleet baseball players
Year of birth missing (living people)